Sardar Bahadur Arjan Singh Chahal  (1839–1908) was a Sikh Chahal Jat of Chahal village in Amritsar in what is now the Indian state of Punjab.  He was only seven when his father Sardar Javala Singh, died in 1846.
He held large Jagirs in Tarn Taran Sahib tehsil, and in the Lyallpur District in the present day Punjab Province of Pakistan.

From 1890 to 1896 Arjan Singh was manager of the Golden Temple, Amritsar He was appointed president of the 11-member lighting committee set up in 1896 to arrange the installation of electricity in the Golden Temple.

He received the title of Sardar Bahadur in 1894, and was made a Companion of the Indian Empire in 1906.  Arjan Singh died at the age of 69 in January 1908.

References

1839 births
1908 deaths
Indian Sikhs
Companions of the Order of the Indian Empire
Sardar Bahadurs